Eurotech is a company dedicated to the research, development, production and marketing of miniature computers (NanoPCs) and high performance computers (HPCs).

Description
Created in 1992, Eurotech is a global company that operates in multiple countries. It follows the technological paradigm of Pervasive Computing. The concept of pervasive or ubiquitous computing, involves miniaturisation and the distribution in the environment of intelligent devices and their possibility of communicating. In this respect, NanoPCs and HPCs are the two major classes of devices that, by connecting to and co-operating, form a computing infrastructure labeled the pervasive GRID or pervasive computing grid.

History
1995

Eurotech was the first to introduce a PC/104 module based on the Intel 32-bit 486DX processor.

1997

The company inked agreements with European distributors. Eurotech moved its headquarters to Amaro (province of Udine in North-East Italy) and the company became a joint-stock company (Italian short form = S.p.A.).

1998

Eurotech signed distribution agreements in America, Asia and Australia. Eurotech set up Neuricam S.p.A., a spin-off of the Trento institute for scientific and technological research.

1999

Eurotech started to co-operate with INFN (Italian Institute of Nuclear Physics) for the study and implementation of its third generation of Array Processor Experiment supercomputers, called APEmille. Eurotech's HPC business unit began with this cooperation.

2000

The company opened a commercial branch in the United States, and announced clusters based on CompactPCI.

2001

The private equity fund First Gen-e of Meliorbanca Spa and Friulia, development finance company of the Friuli-Venezia-Giulia Region, invested 3,7 million Euros.

2002

The company acquired IPS Sistemi Programmabili S.r.l. (Varese, Italy).

2003

Eurotech acquired Parvus Corporation (Salt Lake City, US).

2004

Eurotech acquired French company Erim Développement S.a.s and Finnish company Vikerkaar Oy, now Eurotech France and Eurotech Finland, respectively.

2005

The company presented its apeNEXT supercomputer, realized in collaboration with INFN. A research centre on pervasive computing was activated at Nanjing University of Technology (NJUT) in China. The group created a Scientific Committee dedicated to identifying future trends. To finance its international growth, Eurotech went public on 30 November. The company is listed in the Star segment (high performance equities segment) of the Italian Stock Exchange (Borsa Italiana), raising 23.64 million Euros at IPO.

2006

Eurotech acquired Arcom Control Systems Ltd (based in Cambridge, England) and Arcom Control Systems Inc. (based in Kansas, US). The company created EthLab in the Trento area to become the group's research centre. Eurotech issued common shares for a total value of €109.24 million. It presented the first prototype of the wrist-worn computer Zypad at the 2006 Soldier Technologies Conference in London, and winning the prize for the most innovative product. Eurotech signed a partnership agreement with Finmeccanica SpA.

2007

Eurotech acquired Applied Data Systems (ADS), an American company controlling 65% of Chinese R&D company Vantron. In September, Arcom Control Systems Ltd changed its name to Eurotech Ltd. In October Eurotech acquired the 65% of the outstanding shares of the Japanese Group Advanet.

2008

The company presented Janus, the new generation of supercomputers born from an Italian-Spanish collaboration involving several Universities and Research Institutes. Eurotech completed the merger between United States-based subsidiaries Arcom Control Systems Inc and Applied Data Systems into Eurotech Inc, which became the main US subsidiary. On 5 November, Finmeccanica acquired 11.1% of Eurotech.

2009

Eurotech wins the Platinum Award 2008 from VDC Research Group in the Embedded Board Vendor category. Eurotech joins PROSPECT e.V. (PROmotion of Supercomputing and PEtaComputing Technologies), a leading European consortium for the development and use of next-generation supercomputers, headed by three institutions: the Jülich Supercomputing Centre, the Barcelona Supercomputing Centre and the Leibniz-Rechenzentrum Garching. At the International Supercomputer Conference (ISC) 2009 in Hamburg, Eurotech unveils Aurora, a revolutionary HPC system that sets a record in footprint reduction and dramatically cuts TCO (Total Cost of Ownership) for installations of every size, with an energy saving of up to 60% due to a direct liquid cooling system.

2010

Eurotech announces the introduction of Aurora Au-5600, the "green" supercomputer with liquid cooling, based on the Intel Xeon 5600 processor. Eurotech and Wind River announce a strategic partnership to accelerate the development of embedded applications: specific Development Kits will allow software developers to being the development of an application in less than an hour whereas the traditional systems require days, if not weeks. This way, the two companies plan to bring the ready-to-use experience of PCs to the embedded market.

2011

Eurotech acquires the remaining shares of Advanet Inc, equal to 10% of the share capital, and thus obtains 100% of the Japanese subsidiary. Dynatem Inc becomes part of the group. From its headquarters in Mission Viejo, California, the company has worked in the embedded computer market since 1981, especially in the VME, VPX and CPCI boards sectors. Connected World Magazine places Eurotech on the CW 100 list for leadership in the M2M Technology and Connected Devices sector. The CW 100 list represents the best companies that are driving the market and that are involved in the introduction of new technologies for connectivity. This list provides a guide of companies that make the difference in the interconnection of devices and M2M technologies, selected by the editors of the Connected World magazine. Eurotech and IBM donate the Message Queuing Telemetry Transport (MQTT) protocol to the Open Source Eclipse Foundation community with the declared intent of creating a new standard for the connectivity of the Internet of Things. The software in question, initially developed by IBM and Eurotech, is today used for various mobile applications. The main European suppliers of HPC technologies such as Allinea, ARM, Bull, Caps Entreprise, Eurotech, ParTec, ST Microelectronics and Xyratex, associated with BSC, CEA, Cineca, Fraunhofer, Forschungszentrum Juelich and LRZ research centers join forces to create a European Technology Platform (PTE), starting from the PROSPECT and Teratec work results. The main PTE objective is to coordinate all European forces involved in the HPC sector, including SME, large European and international companies and research centers, proposing an ambitious research plan to the European Commission.

2012

Eurotech develops the GPU-accelerated supercomputer with the highest density in the HPC sector. The supercomputer will be able to offer a performance of more than 500 Teraflops per cabinet with an energy efficiency of more than three GFlops per watt, reaching a unique and unparalleled result in terms of performance and energy efficiency in this way.

CINECA, the largest Italian computing center selects Eurotech to develop the "Eurora" prototype supercomputer. The new Aurora Tigon product will be the technological basis for the development of the Eurora prototype. CINECA will use this new prototype in various computational science fields, like the study of the fundamental constituents, the physics of condensed matter, astrophysics, biology and earth science.
The Japanese subsidiary Advanet has received a letter of appreciation from the RIKEN and JASRI (Japan Synchrotron Radiation Research Institute) research institutes for its help in creating the XFEL (X-Ray Free Electron Laser) system called "SACLA" (acronym for Spring-8 Angstrom Compact free electron Laser), which became fully operative during 2012. Advanet, one of the first collaborators for the project, contributed to the development of the "Spring-8" accelerator control system, the largest third generation synchrotron in the world, for 15 years through the supply of high speed analog I/O boards and data processing boards.

2013

The Computerworld Honors has named Eurotech Powered SENSUSS Application as a 2013 Laureate. The annual award program honors visionary applications of information technology promoting positive social, economic and educational change. Eurotech and Sensuss M2M Application provide real time assessments that protect the athlete from further potential harm.

Eurotech scored both the first and second place of the Green 500, the ranking of the most energy efficient supercomputers in the world, with the Eurora supercomputer installed at CINECA and the Aurora Tigon supercomputer installed at the Finmeccanica company Selex ES, specialised in information technology and security. Eurora, the supercomputer of CINECA, entered in first place with 3210 MFlop/s per watt, while the system of Selex ES, Aurora Tigon, was ranked second with a value of 3180 MFlop/s per Watt.
Eurotech has signed an agreement with Curtiss-Wright Controls, Inc. – a segment of Curtiss-Wright Corporation – for the sale of 100% of the share capital of Parvus Corporation, the American fully owned subsidiary of the Eurotech Group specialized in embedded computers and COTS subsystems for the US Defence market.

2016

Everyware IoT is the only IoT platform completely available in Open Source through Eclipse.

2018

Eurotech introduces the DynaCOR family of HPEC systems foe Edge AI and deep learning.

2019

Dynatem is re-focused to specialize in the design and manufacture of rugged COTS-based boards and systems for use in defense and aerospace applications. As a Qualified Small Business supplier of systems and engineering services to the defense and aerospace market, Dynatem will operate as an independent business unit within Eurotech Inc..

2020

Operating units
The Eurotech Group is composed of nine main operating units:

Eurotech S.p.A. is the parent company, based in Amaro (Udine, Italy). It designs and produces NanoPC modules, systems and devices for the transportation, defence, medical and industrial sectors. Eurotech develops, manufactures and sells intelligent human-to-machine (H2M) and machine-to-machine (M2M) interfaces for harsh industrial applications.
Eurotech has also a division active in the field of HPCs, which designs, produces and markets high performance computers for extremely demanding applications: these supercomputers are used in the fields of nano and bio-technologies, healthcare, high energy physics and in other applications requiring complex simulations and hence a great computational power.

EthLab is the group's research centre based in the Trento area and has a satellite office in Amaro (Udine), close to the group's headquarters.

Eurotech France is based in Lyon (France). It operates in the field of NanoPCs, mainly in the transportation and in the industrial sectors. Eurotech France participates to the United Nations Global Compact, the world's largest corporate citizenship and sustainability initiative.

Eurotech Ltd is based in Cambridge (UK) and operates in the field of nanoPCs and emphasizing industrial and communication sectors.

Eurotech Inc is based in Columbia, Maryland (US) and has a satellite office in Kansas City, Kansas (US). It designs and builds embedded systems for the transportation and the industrial sectors. Eurotech Inc is an Associate Member of Intel's Embedded and Communications Alliance.

Advanet Group is based in Okayama (Japan). It manufactures single board computers, I/O, data acquisition, and communications products for embedded systems markets. Advanet products include VME, CompactPCI, PCI and PMC boards for PowerPC and Intel Pentium architectures.

Research cooperation with universities
The Eurotech Group employs around 40% of its staff in R&D programs. Eurotech has always operated in close connection with the Universities of Milan, Trento, Trieste and Udine, with IRST (Institute for Scientific and Technological Research of the Trentino region), with Sissa (International School of Advanced Studies based in Trieste) and with INFN (Italian Institute of Nuclear Physics).

As of 2011, Eurotech focused on new-generation supercomputers, wearable PCs and Grid computing.

Markets and products
Eurotech Group's NanoPC offers three lines of products, each dedicated to a specific vertical market.
 Industrial and Automation
 Transportation and Mobility
 Energy and Utilities
 Medical and Healthcare
 Defense and Aerospace

Complementary products 

Zypad is a wrist-worn personal computer.

Aurora is a liquid-cooled supercomputer family developed in collaboration with Aurora Science consortium. Aurora systems were among the first liquid cooled HPC systems. Aurora supercomputers support coexistence of 3D Torus and Infiniband networks (although the 3D Torus is an optional feature) and for its synchronization networks. In 2011 Eurotech released a machine based on the Intel Xeon E5, enabling a standard rack delivering more than 100 Teraflops.

Products
Eurotech provides hardware and software IoT solutions under the brand name of Everyware IoT. Everyware IoT is an integrated platform for the Internet of Things that provides IoT gateways, an open edge framework and a modular cloud infrastructure to connect field devices to business analytics and enterprise applications.

See also

 List of Italian Companies

Notes

References

 https://web.archive.org/web/20090801032356/http://www.securitypark.co.uk/security_article260047.html
 https://web.archive.org/web/20090901053545/http://www.download3k.com/Press-Eurotech-Group-s-Ranking-on-TOP500-Global.html
 http://www.eejournal.com/archives/news/20120615_08/
 http://www.eejournal.com/archives/news/20120615_08/
 http://www.newswiretoday.com/news/128478/
 http://www.oracle.com/technetwork/java/embedded/oracle-hitachi-eurotech-1911897.pdf
 https://web.archive.org/web/20131118101221/http://www.thingworx.com/2012/12/eurotech-thingworx-partnership
 http://www.top500.org/system/178077
 http://insidehpc.com/2012/03/18/eurotech-rolls-out-sandy-bridge-supercomputer/
 http://www.newswiretoday.com/news/130799/
 https://web.archive.org/web/20131118095853/http://www.etp4hpc.eu/members/eurotech/
 http://www.hpc.cineca.it/news/eurotech-eurora-prace-prototype-deployed-cineca-and-infn-scores-first-green500-list
 https://web.archive.org/web/20130921074103/http://www.tomsitpro.com/articles/eurora-tesla-hpc-green_computing-cineca,1-873.html
 https://web.archive.org/web/20131203013653/http://www.green500.org/lists/green201306
 http://www.smallformfactors.com/news/db/?10701
 http://www.tmcnet.com/enews/e-newsletters/Communication-Solutions/20070124/u2281229-eurotech-introduces-wireless-communication-module.htm
 https://web.archive.org/web/20131118225451/http://www.m2mevolution.com/topics/m2mevolution/articles/336554-eurotech-extends-its-passenger-counting-family.htm
 https://web.archive.org/web/20110515082324/http://www.gartner.com/technology/research/cool-vendors/
 https://www.bloomberg.com/apps/news?pid=newsarchive&sid=ah2tADj0cSQM

Companies listed on the Borsa Italiana
Electronics companies of Italy
Computer companies of Italy
Companies established in 1982
Italian brands
Italian companies established in 1982